Plesiothyreus hamillei is a species of sea snail, a marine gastropod mollusk in the family Phenacolepadidae.

Description
The length of the shell attains 7 mm.

Distribution
This marine species occurs off Guadeloupe.

References

 Jensen, R. H. (1997). A Checklist and Bibliography of the Marine Molluscs of Bermuda. Unp. , 547 pp 
 Rosenberg, G.; Moretzsohn, F.; García, E. F. (2009). Gastropoda (Mollusca) of the Gulf of Mexico, Pp. 579–699 in: Felder, D.L. and D.K. Camp (eds.), Gulf of Mexico–Origins, Waters, and Biota. Texas A&M Press, College Station, Texas.

External links
 Fischer, P. (1857). Description d'espèces nouvelles. Journal de Conchyliologie. 5(3): 273-277; pl. 8 fig. 8-9, pl. 11 fig. 7-10
 Dall, W. H. (1889). Reports on the results of dredging, under the supervision of Alexander Agassiz, in the Gulf of Mexico (1877-78) and in the Caribbean Sea (1879-80), by the U.S. Coast Survey Steamer "Blake", Lieut.-Commander C.D. Sigsbee, U.S.N., and Commander J.R. Bartlett, U.S.N., commanding. XXIX. Report on the Mollusca. Part 2, Gastropoda and Scaphopoda. Bulletin of the Museum of Comparative Zoölogy at Harvard College. 18: 1-492, pls. 10-40.

Phenacolepadidae
Gastropods described in 1857